Euphaedra melpomene, the scarce striped forester, is a butterfly in the family Nymphalidae. It is found in Guinea, Sierra Leone, Liberia, and Ivory Coast. The habitat consists of forests.

Subspecies
Euphaedra melpomene melpomene (Sierra Leone, Liberia)
Euphaedra melpomene aubergeriana Hecq, 1981 (Guinea, western Ivory Coast)

References

Butterflies described in 1981
melpomene